Sundsvall–Torpshammar Railway  was a private railway between Torpshammar and Sundsvall in Sweden built in 1874. It was operated by the private company by the same name until 1885 when it was bought by Statens Järnvägar (SJ) and merged with the rest of Norrländska Tvärbanan, that later changed name to Mittbanan.

The original railway was built in narrow gauge, but it was converted to  after the government take-over for SEK 3.6 million. The railway also had a branch line, Matfors–Vattjom Railway that stayed privately owned, but was served by SJ. In 1890, the ownership and operating on the branch line was transferred to Tuna Järnvägs AB.

External links
 Historiskt about the railway 

Railway lines in Sweden
Railway lines opened in 1874
3 ft 6 in gauge railways in Sweden
Standard gauge railways in Sweden